Mohamed Sadiki (born 1957) is the Moroccan Minister of Agriculture, Maritime Fisheries, Rural Development, and Water and Forests. He was appointed as minister on 7 October 2021.

Education 
Sadiki holds a Doctor in Agricultural economics from the IAV Hassan II and a PhD from the University of Minnesota.

References 

Living people
1957 births
Government ministers of Morocco
Moroccan politicians
21st-century Moroccan politicians

University of Minnesota alumni